Saint-Pierre is the capital of the French overseas collectivity of Saint Pierre and Miquelon, off the coast of the Canadian island of Newfoundland. Saint-Pierre is the more populous of the two communes (municipalities) making up Saint Pierre and Miquelon.

Etymology 
The commune is named after Saint Peter, who is one of the patron saints of fishermen.

Geography
The commune of Saint-Pierre is made up of the island of Saint-Pierre proper and several nearby smaller islands, such as L'Île-aux-Marins. Although containing nearly 90% of the inhabitants of Saint Pierre and Miquelon, the commune of Saint-Pierre is considerably smaller in terms of area than the commune of Miquelon-Langlade, which lies to its northwest on Miquelon Island.

The main settlement and communal seat is situated on the north side of a harbour called Barachois, which faces the Atlantic Ocean, on the Saint-Pierre Island's east coast. The mouth of the harbour is guarded by a small chain of islands.

History
Jacques Cartier claimed the islands for France in 1536, after they were discovered by the Portuguese in 1520. At the end of the Seven Years' War in 1763, the islands were turned over to Britain, only to be given back to France in 1816.

Saint-Pierre was an outpost used to transport alcohol from Canada to the United States during Prohibition.

Until 1945, there existed a third commune in Saint Pierre and Miquelon: L'Île-aux-Marins. The commune of L'Île-aux-Marins was annexed by the commune of Saint-Pierre in 1945.

Demographics
The population of Saint-Pierre in 2019 was 5,394, many of whom are of Basque, Breton, Norman or Acadian descent. All inhabitants in the commune live on the island of Saint-Pierre proper.

Government
The commune is led by a mayor and a council. The current mayor, elected in 2020, is Yannick Cambray.

Landmarks
Close to the centre of the harbour's edge lie the Post office and Custom House (staffed by Directorate-General of Customs and Indirect Taxes), behind which is General Charles de Gaulle Square, the town's centre.

Other prominent landmarks include the St. Pierre Cathedral, to the north of the square, rebuilt from 1905 to 1907 after a major fire, and the Pointe aux Canons Lighthouse, at the mouth of the harbour. Further north, close to the town's former hospital, is the Fronton Zazpiak Bat - an arena for the traditional Basque sport of pelota.

Services
The François Dunan Hospital Centre (opened in 2011) is the only hospital in Saint Pierre and Miquelon. There is an attached senior home offering health services at the Maison de retraite Eglantine.

Additionally, there is a municipal library, opened in the 1970s, and a municipal sailing school, opened in 1986.

Transportation
Saint-Pierre Airport, the international airport of Saint-Pierre and Miquelon, is located south of the settlement of Saint-Pierre and is served by Air Saint-Pierre with flights both to Miquelon Airport, five Canadian airports and seasonal service to Paris.

Radio and television
 CBC/Radio-Canada
 Radio Atlantique
 Radio France Outremer

Education
Public primary schools in the commune:
 École maternelle Île aux Enfants
 École maternelle Henriette Bonin
 École élémentaire du Feu-Rouge - As of 2016 it had 172 students. It is in the downtown area of the commune and is one nautical cable from the Île aux Enfants nursery.

Lycée-Collège d'État Émile Letournel is the public secondary school in the commune, with junior high, vocational high, and general senior high/sixth-form programmes.

Private schools:
 École maternelle Saint-Louis de Gonzague
 École élémentaire Sainte-Croisine
 École primaire Sainte-Odile
 Collège Saint-Christophe

Twin towns
Saint-Pierre has been twinned with Port-en-Bessin-Huppain (France) since 1976.

See also
 Miquelon-Langlade

References

External links

 Official website 
 Tourism and Travel Resources for St Pierre & Miquelon

 
Communes of Saint Pierre and Miquelon
Capitals in North America